3-Hydroxybenzaldehyde is an organic compound with the formula .  It is a colorless solid although most samples appear tan.  Two other isomers of hydroxybenzaldehyde exist.

Preparation
It has been prepared from 3-nitrobenzaldehyde in a sequence of nitro group reduction, diazotization of the amine, and hydrolysis.

3-hydroxybenzyl-alcohol dehydrogenase is an NADP-dependent enzyme that produces 3-hydroxybenzaldehyde from 3-hydroxybenzyl alcohol.

Bio-medical properties
3-Hydroxybenzaldehyde exhibits vasculoprotective effects by lowering vascular smooth muscle cell proliferation and endothelial cells inflammation. 3-Hydroxybenzaldehyde is used in the synthesis of monastrol.

See also
 Salicylaldehyde (2-hydroxybenzaldehyde)
 4-Hydroxybenzaldehyde

References

Hydroxybenzaldehydes